Apollo Junior High School is a secondary school in Richardson, Texas. It is part of the Richardson Independent School District.

Apollo is one of two intermediate schools that feed L.V. Berkner High School. Founded in 1977, Apollo educates students in grades 7-8.

Its approximate annual enrollment is 800 students, nearly twice that of the Texas state average for middle schools.  The student-teacher ratio is 16.5:1.

Accomplishments
The Apollo Junior H

In 1998 and 2000, teachers at the school were the recipients of the Edyth May Sliffe Award for excellence in mathematics.

The Apollo Junior High Symphony Orchestra received straight 1's when they played at UIL which took place in UNT's Performing Arts Center. The 1st Violins, Violas and Harpist received awards for their outstanding performance as well. The orchestra is led by Mrs. Thornton and Mrs. Cies.

Notable alumni
 Jensen Ackles, television actor and fashion model (1993) 
 King Von, Famous rapper from chiraq, (1998)

References

External links
 
 Richardson Independent School District
 Apollo Junior High PTA Website
 Apollo Band Website
 Apollo Junior High School profile provided by schooltree.org
 Apollo Junior High School facts provided by RISD

Educational institutions established in 1977
Public middle schools in Texas
Richardson, Texas
1977 establishments in Texas